Benjamin Mead may refer to:
 Benjamin P. Mead (1849–1913), Connecticut politician
 Benjamin C. Mead (1873–1934), American lawyer from New York